Suaeda esteroa is a species of flowering plant in the family Amaranthaceae known by the common name estuary seablite. It is a yellow-green to reddish subshrub with fleshy, succulent leaves. It is native to the estuaries and salt marshes of coastal southern California and Baja California.

External links
 Jepson Manual Treatment
 Calflora.org
 San Diego Sierra Club
 United States Department of Agriculture
 Flora of North America
Photo gallery

Further reading
Ferren, W. R. and S. A. Whitmore. (1983). Suaeda esteroa (Chenopodiaceae), a new species from estuaries of southern California and Baja California. Madroño 30 181–190.

esteroa
Salt marsh plants
Flora of Baja California
Flora of California
Plants described in 1983
Natural history of Los Angeles County, California
Natural history of Orange County, California
Natural history of San Diego County, California
Flora without expected TNC conservation status